Oreolalax pingii (Chinese lazy toad or Ping's toothed toad) is a species of amphibian in the family Megophryidae.
It is endemic to south-western China where it is restricted to the Daliang and Hengduan Mountains in Sichuan and Yunnan.
Its natural habitats are subtropical moist montane forests, moist shrubland, and rivers.
It is threatened by habitat loss.

Range
It is known only from two locations.
Daliangshan in Zhaojue County, Sichuan
Daliangshan in Yuexi County, Sichuan

Morphology

References

Oreolalax
Amphibians of China
Endemic fauna of China
Taxonomy articles created by Polbot
Amphibians described in 1943
Endangered Fauna of China